Termioptycha albifurcalis is a moth in the family Pyralidae. It is found in India and Sri Lanka.

References

Pyralidae